Gmina Jastków is a rural gmina (administrative district) in Lublin County, Lublin Voivodeship, in eastern Poland.

Villages
Gmina Jastków contains the villages and settlements of Barak, Dąbrowica, Dębówka, Jastków, Józefów, Ługów, Marysin, Moszenki, Moszna, Moszna-Kolonia, Natalin, Ożarów, Panieńszczyzna, Piotrawin, Płouszowice, Płouszowice-Kolonia, Sieprawice, Sieprawki, Sługocin, Smugi, Snopków, Tomaszowice, Tomaszowice-Kolonia and Wysokie.

Neighbouring gminas
Gmina Jastków is bordered by the city of Lublin and by the gminas of Garbów, Konopnica, Nałęczów, Niemce and Wojciechów.

References

External links
Polish official population figures 2006

Jastkow
Lublin County